The Fifth Gymnasium is a high school in Zagreb, Croatia specialising in science and mathematics.  It was opened on 7 November 1938. Today it has about 900 students in 28 classes. It is considered to be the most prestigious gymnasium in Zagreb alongside the XV Gymnasium.

Students are known for often excelling in mathematics, physics, chemistry, biology, Latin, computer science, history, geography and logic.

Also, students have taken part in the International Mathematical Olympiad and the International Chemistry Olympiad, where they have received various medals, and also the International Physics Olympiad.

History

The secondary school was initially founded in 1938 as a single-sex general gymnasium. Locally, it known as the Fifth Male Gymnasium of Zagreb. In its first year of existence, there were 762 students enrolled, with 45 students per class.      

In 1946, a year after Croatia's entrance into Yugoslavia, its name was changed to the Fifth Gymnasium of Bogdan Ogrizović.  was a prominent physicist in Zagreb who was best known as a high school teacher of physics and mathematics. He died during WWII.

In the period of Croatia's scrapping of the single-sex model and the creation co-educational institutions, the school merged in 1960 with the Seventh Woman's Gymnasium. 
After this, it transformed into a high school primarily specialising in a program of mathematics and scientific subjects.

In 1977, after a reform on education and gymnasiums, the school changed its name to the Pedagogical Education Centre. However, it still retained its emphasis and reputation for natural sciences and mathematics.

After the collapse of Yugoslavia, it has again been known as the Fifth Gymnasium.

Notable alumni

Sven Medvešek, a famous theatre actor in Croatia and stage director
Rene Medvešek, a well-known theatre actor in Croatia, and additionally a stage director
Zoran Čutura, a professional basketball player and also sports columnist
Žarko Puhovski, a political analyst and Marxist theorist
 Davor Pavun, a physicist, university professor, inventor, and educational speaker

References

External links
 

Gymnasiums in Croatia
Gymnasium, 05
Education in Zagreb
Donji grad, Zagreb
Educational institutions established in 1938
1938 establishments in Croatia
School buildings completed in 1938
Neoclassical architecture in Croatia